Whorlton may refer to:
Whorlton, County Durham, a village in County Durham, in England
Whorlton, North Yorkshire, a hamlet and civil parish in the Hambleton district of North Yorkshire, England